South College is a private for-profit college with its main campus in Knoxville, Tennessee. It offers more than 80 programs and concentrations, including certificate, associate, bachelor's, master's, educational specialist, and doctoral programs.

History

Knoxville Business College was founded in 1882.  It was acquired by Stephen A. South in 1989, obtained accreditation from the Southern Association of Colleges and Schools Commision on Colleges in 2000 and changed its name to South College in 2002.

 2003 – Became eligible for student participation in Tennessee HOPE Scholarship
 2007 – Started Master of Health Science in Physician Assistant program, the institution’s first master’s level program
 2012 – Started Doctor of Pharmacy program, the institution’s first doctoral level program
 2015 – Started Doctor of Physical Therapy program as first hybrid program in U.S.; became eligible for student participation in Tennessee Promise scholarship program; and established associated South College Opportunity Grant
 2016 – Completed merger for South College Asheville campus
 2017 – Established South College Nashville campus
 2017 - Launched South College Promise Grant and South College Military Grant
 2018 – Established Online Operations Center in Pittsburgh, Pennsylvania
 2018 – Established South College Atlanta campus
 2019 – First earned Top 10 School Military Friendly Rating
 2019 – Established Department of Dental Education at South College Nashville campus with full-service dental clinic and two dental programs. 
 2021 – Established South College Indianapolis campus
 2021 – Established South College Orlando campus
 2022 - Started Doctor of Nursing Practice with aa Concentration in Nurse Anesthesia
 2022 – Established South College Pittsburgh campus

Campuses
 Knoxville, Tennessee (2 locations)
 Asheville, North Carolina
 Nashville, Tennessee
 Atlanta, Georgia
 Indianapolis, Indiana
 Orlando, Florida 
 Pittsburgh, Pennsylvania
 Online – Online Operations Center is located in Pittsburgh, Pennsylvania.

Academics
South College currently offers more than 80 programs and concentrations in a variety of disciplines in the Schools of Business and Technology, Computer Science and Engineering, Physical Therapy, Pharmacy, Physician Assistant Studies, Legal Studies, Nursing, and Education. Health & Therapy and Ministry programs are offered as well. Education is career-focused and offered through several channels, including on campus, hybrid, and distance learning.

South College is accredited by the Southern Association of Colleges and Schools Commission on Colleges. Various programs have earned programmatic accreditation or approval as well.

References

External links

University and college buildings on the National Register of Historic Places in Tennessee
Universities and colleges in Knoxville, Tennessee
Educational institutions established in 1882
For-profit universities and colleges in the United States
Universities and colleges accredited by the Southern Association of Colleges and Schools
Private universities and colleges in Tennessee
Knoxville, Tennessee
National Register of Historic Places in Knoxville, Tennessee
1882 establishments in Tennessee